The men's time trial at the 2004 UCI Road World Championships was held on 29 September 2004 in Verona, Italy.

Classification

References

Men's Time Trial
UCI Road World Championships – Men's time trial